Brian Anthony Cottington (born 14 February 1965 in Hammersmith, England), is an English footballer who played as a midfielder. He played in the Football League for Fulham and Aldershot.

References

External links

1965 births
Living people
English footballers
People from Hammersmith
English people of Irish descent
Fulham F.C. players
Aldershot F.C. players
Enfield F.C. players
English Football League players
National League (English football) players
Association football defenders